Move It: Clash of the Streetdancers is a Philippine televised dance competition broadcast on TV5 and premiered on January 25, 2015. It is hosted by Jasmine Curtis-Smith and Tom Taus. It airs every Sunday at 8:00pm (PST) after Mac & Chiz.

Hosts
 Jasmine Curtis-Smith
 Tom Taus

See also
 List of programs broadcast by TV5

References

External links
 

TV5 (Philippine TV network) original programming
Philippine reality television series
2015 Philippine television series debuts
2015 Philippine television series endings
Filipino-language television shows